Suusamyr Valley lies  at 2,000-2,500 meters above the sea level between Suusamyr Too and Kyrgyz Ala-Too ranges of Tian Shan mountains in Central Asia. The river Suusamyr flows through it. The valley is predominantly used as "alpine summer pastures full of herbs and wild flowers – carpeting the valley floor in many colours."

The valley is located in Chüy Region of Kyrgyzstan. Bishkek — Osh (M41) (European route E010) road enters the valley at the tunnel under  Töö Ashuu Pass and leaves it at Ala-Bel Pass.

References

Valleys of Kyrgyzstan